Ruter Hall is a historic building located on the campus of Allegheny College at Meadville, Pennsylvania, United States.  It was built in 1853, and is a three-story, rectangular brick building in the Greek Revival style.  It measures 50 feet by 90 feet, and has a low gabled roof and pediment.  It was the second building built on the Allegheny College campus, after Bentley Hall.  It is named for Rev. Martin Ruter, the first Methodist president of the college from 1834 to 1837. It currently houses the college's Modern and Classical Languages and International Studies departments.

It was added to the National Register of Historic Places in 1978.

References

School buildings on the National Register of Historic Places in Pennsylvania
Greek Revival architecture in Pennsylvania
School buildings completed in 1853
Buildings and structures in Crawford County, Pennsylvania
Meadville, Pennsylvania
National Register of Historic Places in Crawford County, Pennsylvania